The ransingha or ransinga is a type of primitive trumpet made of copper or copper alloys, used in both India and Nepal. The instrument is made of two metal curves, joined together to form an "S" shape. It may also be reassembled to form a crescent.

It is part of a group of curved-tube instruments that include the ransingha, the narsinga and the sringa. It may also be related to the laawaa and Tibetan dungchen, both straight tubular copper horns.

Alternate names
The instrument's name has been variously spelled narsinga, ransingha, ramsinga, and srnga.

Srnga is Sanscrit for horn and used in North India and Nepal. Its modern forms include "Sig", "Siga,", and "Singha". The term was historically used for a wide variety shapes and sizes of horns, including straight horns, and horns made from water buffalo horns with mouthpieces made from ox horns.

Ramsingha

The ramsinga is a pronunciation specific to India. It uses four pipes of very thin metal which fit one within the other. It is mentioned in Emilio Salgari's works such as The Mystery of the Black Jungle (1895), where it is associated with the thugee cult.

In Chapter 62 of Foucault's Pendulum (1988) the Ramsinga is also mentioned, being played by a devotee of a druidic sect .

Narsinga
Played historically in C shape in Nepa by Damai caste musicians in groups such as the damai baja. This form used in Nepal, Himachal Pradesh and southern Bihar.

See also
Karnal, a long strait trumpet
Sringa

References

External links
History of the ransingha or narsinga with photos.
 Ancient musical instruments of India (circa 18th Century) as depicted by Balthazar Solvyns in Les Hindoûs (Indira Gandhi National Centre for the Arts, IGNCA)

Natural horns and trumpets
Music of Himachal Pradesh
Culture of Uttarakhand
Folk music instruments
Indian musical instruments
Trumpets of Nepal
Indian inventions